The anterolateral sulcus (or ventrolateral sulcus) is a sulcus on the side of the medulla oblongata between the olive and pyramid. The rootlets of the hypoglossal nerve (CN XII) emerge from this sulcus.

See also
 Anterolateral sulcus of spinal cord

External links
 https://web.archive.org/web/20070927162204/http://www.ib.amwaw.edu.pl/anatomy/atlas/image_02e.htm

Medulla oblongata